Tuska Open Air Metal Festival, commonly shortened to Tuska, is a Finnish heavy metal festival taking place annually in Helsinki. The first Tuska took place in 1998 and the festival has since grown larger every year. The location of the festival has been in Kaisaniemi park in the middle of the city from 2001. However, since 2011, Tuska has taken place at the Suvilahti event field in the Kalasatama neighbourhood of the Sörnäinen district. The festival dates have always been in either June or July.

In recent years the attendance has grown and the festival has drawn up to 49,000 people in 2022. In 2006, the festival was almost sold out and over a combined three-day total of 33,000 attendees arrived to watch 32 artists, including for example Anathema, Celtic Frost, Opeth, Sodom, Venom, and Finland's own Amorphis and Sonata Arctica.

In 2022 there were four stages named Tuska KVLT, Inferno, Tent Stage and Radio Rock Main Stage.

Artists by year
Headliners are shown in bold.

1998
Am I Blood, Babylon Whores, Barathrum, Gandalf, Gorgoroth, Impaled Nazarene, Timo Rautiainen & Trio Niskalaukaus and others.

1999
...And Oceans, Amorphis, Barathrum, Dark Tranquillity, Gandalf, Lullacry, Nightwish, Painflow, Sentenced, Tarot, The 69 Eyes, Throne of Chaos, Timo Rautiainen & Trio Niskalaukaus, Two Witches and others.

2000
Audience: 5 000+

Babylon Whores, Children of Bodom, Diablo, Eternal Tears of Sorrow, Finntroll, Gamma Ray, Impaled Nazarene, Lullacry, Metal Gods, Nightwish, Pain, Satyricon, Sinergy, Stone, Terveet Kädet, The Black League, The Crown, Timo Rautiainen & Trio Niskalaukaus, To/Die/For

2001
Audience: ca. 10 000

Amon Amarth, Amorphis, Drive, Eläkeläiset, Finntroll, Gandalf, Headplate, Impaled Nazarene, In Flames, Katatonia, Kotiteollisuus, Rhapsody of Fire, Rotten Sound, Stratovarius, The 69 Eyes, Timo Rautiainen & Trio Niskalaukaus, Transport League, United, Yearning and others

2002
Audience: 15 000 (sold out)

Ajattara, Blake, Bruce Dickinson, Diablo, Demigod, Ensiferum, Impaled Nazarene, Machine Head, Maj Karman Kauniit Kuvat, Marduk, Moonsorrow, Mustasch, Nightwish, Sara, Sentenced, Sonata Arctica, Suburban Tribe, The Crown, Timo Rautiainen & Trio Niskalaukaus and others

2003
Audience: ca. 16 500

Amorphis, Arch Enemy, Barathrum, Behemoth, Children Of Bodom, Edguy, Finntroll, Horna, Immortal Souls, Lordi, Lost Horizon, Lullacry, Mannhai, Ministry, Mokoma, Moonsorrow, Norther, Reverend Bizarre, Rotten Sound, Sentenced, Soulfly, Stratovarius, Tarot, The 69 Eyes, The Haunted, Thunderstone, Thyrane, Timo Rautiainen & Trio Niskalaukaus, Type O Negative and others

2004
Audience (a combined three day total): ca. 30 000

Beseech, Blake, Charon, Dark Funeral, Dark Tranquillity, Death Angel, Dew-Scented, Diablo, Dio, Dismember, Drive, Ensiferum, Fear Factory, In Flames, Impaled Nazarene, Kilpi, Kotiteollisuus, Nasum, Nightwish, Machine Men, Mokoma, Sinergy, Soilwork, Sonata Arctica, Suburban Tribe, Swallow the Sun, Timo Rautiainen & Trio Niskalaukaus, Turisas, Twilightning and others

2005
Audience (a combined three day total): 33 000+ (sold out)

Accept, Ajattara, Amoral, Apocalyptica, Callisto, Children of Bodom, Deathchain, Destruction, Dimmu Borgir, Evergrey, Finntroll, Gamma Ray, Hieronymus Bosch, Lake of Tears, Mnemic, Monster Magnet, Naglfar, Pain Confessor, Paska, Primal Fear, Rotten Sound, Scarve, Sentenced, Skyclad, Stam1na, Teräsbetoni, Testament, Thunderstone, Turmion Kätilöt, Viikate, Wintersun and others

2006
Audience (a combined three day total): ca. 33 000

Amorphis, Anathema, Arch Enemy, Burst, Celtic Frost, Deathstars, Diablo, Epica, Freedom Call, Gojira, Impaled Nazarene, Kalmah, Mendeed, Metsatöll, Mokoma, Nine, Norther, Opeth, Pain Confessor, Sodom, Sonata Arctica, Stam1na, Suburban Tribe, Swallow the Sun, Tarot, The Scourger, The Sisters Of Mercy, Timo Rautiainen, Venom, Verjnuarmu, Wintersun

2007
Audience (a combined three day total): ca. 33 000

Before the Dawn, Blind Guardian, Brother Firetribe, Children of Bodom, D'espairsRay, DragonForce, Emperor, Finntroll, Hatesphere, Immortal, Imperia, Insomnium, Isis, Katatonia, Legion of the Damned, Maj Karma, Mercenary, Misery Index, Moonsorrow, Moonspell, Naildown, Pain, Profane Omen, Stratovarius, Sturm Und Drang, Thunderstone, Turisas, Vader, W.A.S.P. and others

2008
Audience (a combined three day total): 36 000 (sold out)

Amon Amarth, Before the Dawn, Behemoth, Carcass, Diablo, Dimmu Borgir, Dream Evil, Dying Fetus, Entombed, Fields of the Nephilim, Ghost Brigade, Kalmah, Killswitch Engage, Kiuas, Kreator, KYPCK, Mokoma, Morbid Angel, Nile, Primordial, Shade Empire, Slayer, Sonata Arctica, Sotajumala, Stam1na, The Scourger, The Sorrow, Tracedawn and Týr and others

2009
Audience (a combined three day total): ca. 28 000

All That Remains, Amoral, Amorphis, The Black Dahlia Murder, Callisto, Dauntless, Deathchain, Eluveitie, Ensiferum, Evile, Firewind, Gama Bomb, Girugamesh, Gojira, Immortal, Jon Oliva's Pain, Legion of the Damned, Mucc, My Dying Bride, Neurosis, Parkway Drive, Pestilence, Profane Omen, Rotten Sound, Sabaton, Stam1na, Suicidal Tendencies, The Faceless, Volbeat and others

2010
Audience (a combined three day total): 33 000+ (sold out).

Amatory, Barren Earth, Bloodbath, Cannibal Corpse, Devin Townsend, Devin Townsend Project, Finntroll, Holy Grail, Hypocrisy, Insomnium, Kamelot, Megadeth, Nevermore, Nile, Obituary, Overkill, Pain, Rytmihäiriö, Satyricon, Sotajumala, Swallow The Sun, Tarot, Testament, Torture Killer, Trigger The Bloodshed, Warmen, W.A.S.P., Crowbar

2011
Audience (a combined three day total): 35 000+

Amon Amarth, Amorphis, At the Gates, Arch Enemy, Blind Guardian, The Devin Townsend Project, Epica, Exodus, Forbidden, Meshuggah, Morbid Angel, Katatonia, Kvelertak, Killing Joke, Electric Wizard, Enslaved, Moonsorrow, Wintersun, Witchery, Agnostic Front, Spiritual Beggars, Turisas, Impaled Nazarene, Grave, Shining, Mygrain, Church of Misery, Misery Index, Lighthouse Project, Black Breath, Tarot, Bulldozer, Hell, Omnium Gatherum, Ghost, Medeia, Rotten Sound and others

2012
Audience (a combined three day total): 26 000+

Alcest, Amoral, Animals as Leaders, Apocalyptica, Arcturus, Baroness, Behemoth, Demigod, Edguy, Exodus, For the Imperium, Hatebreed, Horna, Insomnium, Jess and the Ancient Ones, Lamb of God, Megadeth, Metsatöll, Ministry, Mokoma, Napalm Death, One Morning Left, Overkill, Profane Omen, Sabaton, Saint Vitus, Skeletonwitch, Sonata Arctica, Suicide Silence, Suidakra, Swallow the Sun, Textures, The Man-Eating Tree, Trivium, Victims, Winterwolf and others

2013

Audience (a combined three day total): 25 000+

Nightwish, King Diamond, Testament, Bolt Thrower, Kreator, Amorphis, Stam1na, Soilwork, Stratovarius, Wintersun, Amaranthe, Ihsahn, Leprous, Asking Alexandria, TesseracT, Von, Urfaust, We Butter the Bread with Butter, Deathchain, Black City, Abhorrence, Torture Killer, Dreamtale, Hateform, Santa Cruz and others

2014
Audience (a combined three day total): 24 000+ 

Emperor, Anthrax, Dimmu Borgir, Children of Bodom, Satyricon, Bring Me the Horizon, Neurosis, Carcass, Stone, Shining, Turmion Kätilöt, Insomnium, Ensiferum, Orphaned Land, Metal Church, Poisonblack, We Came as Romans, Battle Beast, Tankard, Hamferð, Powerwolf, Santa Cruz, Beastmilk, Amoral, Speedtrap, Cutdown, Altair, Arion and others

2015
Audience (a combined three day total): 25 000+ 

Alice Cooper, Sabaton, In Flames, Lamb Of God, Opeth, Abbath, Exodus, Amorphis, Stratovarius, Mokoma, Architects, Loudness, Bloodbath, Blues Pills, Ghost Brigade, Ne Obliviscaris, Einherjer, Warmen, The Sirens, Sotajumala, Krokodil, Bombus, Enforcer and others

2016
Audience (a combined three day total): 28 000+ 

Ghost, Avantasia, Children of Bodom, Testament, Anthrax, Behemoth, Katatonia, Stam1na, Kvelertak, Hatebreed, Turmion Kätilöt, Gojira, With the Dead, Lordi, Swallow the Sun, Cain's Offering, Diablo, Primordial, Thunderstone, Tsjuder, Cattle Decapitation, Obscura, Havok, Nervosa, Myrkur, Delain, Mantar, Beast In Black, Jess and the Ancient Ones and others

2017

20th Anniversary broke Tuska's all time visitor record until 2019, at 37,000 over 3 festival days.

HIM, Sabaton, Mastodon, Apocalyptica plays Metallica by four cellos, Devin Townsend Project, Suicidal Tendencies, Amorphis, Mayhem, Triptykon, Timo Rautiainen & Trio Niskalaukaus, Soilwork, Sonata Arctica, Dirkschneider, Wintersun, Baroness, Electric Wizard, Mokoma, Insomnium, Lost Society, Anneke Van Giersbergen's Vuur, Brujeria, Rotten Sound, Avatarium, Battle Beast, Brother Firetribe, Jimsonweed, Impaled Nazarene, Barathrum, Baptism, Oranssi Pazuzu, Trap Them, LIK, The Raven Age, Kohti Tuhoa, Ratface, Pekko Käppi & KHHL, Huora, Amendfoil, Demonztrator, Fear Of Domination, Mind Riot, Sleep of Monsters, Throes of Dawn, Paara, Alabama Kush

2018

Audience (a combined three day total): 34 000+

Body Count ft. Ice-T, Gojira, Parkway Drive, Kreator, Europe, Dead Cross, Arch Enemy, Emperor, Meshuggah, At The Gates, Clutch, Timo Rautiainen & Trio Niskalaukaus, Crowbar, Mokoma, Turmion Kätilöt, Ihsahn, Hallatar, Moonsorrow, Leprous, Carpenter Brut, The 69 Eyes, Beast In Black, Bombus, Grave Pleasures, Lauri Porra Flyover Ensemble, Tribulation, Shiraz Lane, Stick To Your Guns, Charm The Fury, Mantar, Arion, Foreseen, Red Death, Feastem, Hard Action, Hexhammer, Galactic Empire, Gloomy Grim, Crimfall, Blind Channel, Baest, Temple Balls, Black Royal, Six Inch, Keoma, Tyrantti

2019

22nd Tuska Festival took place from 28 to 30 June 2019. 
Record audience (combined three days total): 43 000+.
Slayer, Amorphis, The Hellacopters, Anthrax, Opeth, Behemoth, Dimmu Borgir, Halestorm, Stam1na, Kvelertak, Cult of Luna, Frank Carter & The Rattlesnakes, Sick of It All, Heilung, Battle Beast, Swallow the Sun, Marko Hietala, Anneke van Giersbergen, Loudness, Lost Society, Delain, Power Trip, Jinjer, Maj Karma, Rytmihäiriö, Arion, Leverage, Alien Weaponry, Medeia, Fear of Domination, Wheel, Dark Sarah, Warkings, Visions of Atlantis, Brymir, De Lirium's Order, Goatburner, Mustan Kuun Lapset, I Revolt, Kaiser, Pahan Ikoni, Palehorse, Sata Kaskelottia, Balance Breach, Wake Up Frankie, Hevisaurus, Sharon Rircharson, JP Ahonen, Mika Jussila, Valnoir, Ester Segarra and Scar.fi.

2020
Tuska 2020 was cancelled on 23 April due to the Coronavirus epidemic after the Finnish government forbid events larger than 500 people until the end of July 2020. Bands that were announced prior to the cancellation included Korn, Faith No More, Deftones, Gojira, Symphony X, Devin Townsend, Bodom after Midnight, Insomnium, Amon Amarth and Vltimas.

2021
Tuska 2021 was cancelled on 16 April due to the Coronavirus situation and its effects.

2022

23rd Tuska Festival took place from 1 to 3 July 2022. 
Record audience (combined three days total): 49 000+.
Korn, Mercyful Fate, Deftones, Carcass, Amorphis, Kreator, Devin Townsend, Heilung, Stam1na, Beast In Black, Stratovarius, Northern Kings, Jinjer, Ensiferum, Baroness, Eluveitie, Insomnium, Soilwork, Lost Society, Blind Channel, Reckless Love, Sonata Arctica, Perturbator, Red Fang, Gloryhammer, Joe Lynn Turner, Elder, High on Fire, Oranssi Pazuzu, VOLA, The Night Flight Orchestra, Vltimas, Wheel, Omnium Gatherum, Bloodred Hourglass, Lähiöbotox, Shape of Despair, Church of the Dead, Marianas Rest, Humavoid, Detset, Polymoon, One Morning Left, Verikalpa, Enphin, Abstrakt, The Rivet, Shereign, Amoth, Astralion, Denominate, King Satan, Cryptic Hatred, The Mist from the Mountains, Rebellix, Edge of Haze, Atlas, Numento and Sacred Dimension.

2023

Upcoming 24th Tuska Festival takes place from 30 June to 2 July 2023.

Ghost, Gojira, Ville Valo (VV), Arch Enemy, In Flames, The Hu, Electric Callboy, Motionless in White, Jinjer, Clutch, Lorna Shore, While She Sleeps, Marko Hietala, Avatar, Glenn Hughes, Haken, Spiritbox, Suffocation, Turmion Kätilöt, Mokoma, Lost Society, Memoriam, Butcher Babies, Swallow the Sun, Diablo, Finntroll, Dance with the Dead, Xysma, Imperial Triumphant, Imminence, Blood Incantation, Orbit Culture, Vended, Brymir, A.A. Williams, Foreseen, Smackbound, Silver Bullet, Vermilia, Galvanizer, Solothus, ...And Oceans, Dreamtale, Dirt, Miseria Ultima, Sepulchral Curse, Bob Malmström, Ashen Tomb, Nakkeknaekker, Vansidian, Kouta, Kúru, Nervebreak, Angles Mortis, Slash the Smile and Irrational Cause.

See also
 Sauna Open Air Metal Festival

References

External links

Official website

Festivals in Helsinki
Heavy metal festivals in Finland
Rock festivals in Finland
Music festivals established in 1998
Summer events in Finland